The Salzkammergut and Upper Austria Alps (Oberösterreichisch-Salzkammerguter Alpen in German) is the proposed name for a subdivision of mountains in a new classification of the Alps, which are located in Austria.

Etymology 
Salzkammergut is the name of a historical territory and literally means Estate of the Salt Chamber; it derives from the Imperial Salt Chamber, the authority charged with running the precious salt mines in the Habsburg empire.

Geography 
Administratively the range belongs to the Austrian state of Upper Austria, Salzburg and, marginally, to Styria.
The whole range is drained by the Danube river.

SOIUSA classification 
According to SOIUSA (International Standardized Mountain Subdivision of the Alps) the mountain range is an Alpine section, classified in the following way:
 main part = Eastern Alps
 major sector = Northern Limestone Alps
 section = Salzkammergut and Upper Austria Alps
 code = II/B-25

Subdivision 
The range is divided into four Alpine subsections:
 Dachstein mountains (De:Dachsteingebirge) – SOIUSA code:II/B-25.I;
 Salzkammergut mountains (De:Salzkammergut-Berge) – SOIUSA code:II/B-25.II;
 Totes mountains (De:Totes Gebirge) – SOIUSA code:II/B-25.III;
 Upper Austrian Prealps (De:Oberösterreichische Voralpen) – SOIUSA code:II/B-25.IV.

Notable summits

Some notable summits of the range are:

References

Mountain ranges of the Alps
Mountain ranges of Upper Austria
Mountain ranges of Styria
Mountain ranges of Salzburg (state)